Nehru Stadium is a multi-purpose stadium in Guwahati, Assam, India. It was built in 1962 and  holds the capacity of 15,000 spectators. Radha Govinda Baruah supervised, constructed and named it as Nehru Stadium. The stadium is operated by the Board of Sports of Assam, Government of Assam. It is used both for football and cricket matches.

It has hosted 13 One Day Internationals matches and many matches of domestic cricket tournaments like Ranji Trophy, Duleep Trophy and Deodhar Trophy. In football, it regularly hosts prestigious Bordoloi Trophy and GSA Super Division Football League. The stadium has also hosted Santosh Trophy and Federation Cup, two top level domestic football tournaments of India.

All records and statistics 

Leading run scorers are Yuvraj Singh- 181 runs, Michael Bevan- 163 runs and Dinesh Mongia- 159 runs. Leading wicket takers are Ravi Shastri and Harbhajan Singh- 7 wickets.

List of centuries

Key
 * denotes that the batsman was not out.
 Inns. denotes the number of the innings in the match.
 Balls denotes the number of balls faced in an innings.
 NR denotes that the number of balls was not recorded.
 Parentheses next to the player's score denotes his century number at Edgbaston.
 The column title Date refers to the date the match started.
 The column title Result refers to the player's team result

Centuries in One Day Internationals

List of five wicket hauls

Key

Five Wicket Hauls

See also
Assam Cricket Association Stadium, Guwahati
Indira Gandhi Athletic Stadium

External links
 Info on venue.

References

Cricket grounds in Assam
Multi-purpose stadiums in India
Sports venues in Guwahati
Football venues in Assam
Sports venues completed in 1962
1962 establishments in Assam
20th-century architecture in India